Tabriz County is in East Azerbaijan province, Iran. The capital of the county is the city of Tabriz. At the 2006 census, the county's population was 1,557,241 in 423,775 households. The following census in 2011 counted 1,695,094 people in 513,142 households. At the 2016 census, the county's population was 1,773,033 in 563,660 households.

Administrative divisions

The population history of Tabriz County's administrative divisions over three consecutive censuses is shown in the following table. The latest census shows two districts, six rural districts, and four cities.

In 2021, Basmenj District was formed from Meydan Chay Rural District and the city of Basmenj. At the same time, Mehranrud Rural District was established in the Central District from parts of Esperan Rural District.

References

 

Counties of East Azerbaijan Province